Saint-Romuald is a district within the Les Chutes-de-la-Chaudière-Est borough of Lévis, Quebec, Canada, located on the south shore of the Saint Lawrence River across from Quebec City. The district was formerly a town (Saint-Romuald d'Etchemin), but was amalgamated with Lévis on January 1, 2002.

The largest oil refinery in eastern Canada, owned by Valero Energy Corporation, is located in Saint-Romuald.

The Quebec Bridge connects Saint-Romuald to Sainte-Foy, a district of Quebec City.

The Etchemin River flows into the Saint Lawrence River at Saint-Romuald.

The district is named after a Roman Catholic parish, which is named in honour of Saint Romuald (c. 951–June 19, 1027), the founder of the Camaldolese order. The church is described as neo-classical in style and was built in 1855 by Joseph and Louis Larose.

According to the Canada 2006 Census:
Population: 11,633
% Change (2001–06): +7.3
Dwellings: 5,568
Area (km2): 17.16 km2
Density (persons per km2): 677.9

Notable people
Gérard Bolduc, founder of the Quebec International Pee-Wee Hockey Tournament
Ariane Moffatt, singer-songwriter

References

Neighbourhoods in Lévis, Quebec
Former municipalities in Quebec
Populated places disestablished in 2002